International SOS is a health and security service firm. The company takes around four million assistance calls every year
and has almost two-thirds of the Fortune Global 500 companies as clients.

Services 
International SOS focuses on helping organisations and their people reduce exposure to, and mitigate, health, wellbeing and security risks. Their services include providing a feed of information on world events, assistance services, health consultancy and programmes, education, advice and medical equipment. It advises on preventive programmes and assisting with emergency response for employees, including domestic workers, business travellers, expatriates and their dependents. Its centres are staffed by physicians, nurses, paramedics, EMT's, operations managers, multilingual coordinators and logistics support personnel. It also has a global network of external service providers including specialist doctors, hospitals, ambulances, charter aircraft and security personnel.

The firm's Tracker service monitors the travel of 10 million people, helping organisations to know where their employees are in a crisis. The firm joined risk management consultancy Control Risks in releasing an itinerary-forwarding feature TravelTracker in 2016.

The firm operates air ambulances services out of South Africa, Singapore, China, Papua New Guinea, and the Middle East. It airlifted 18,000 emergency cases in 2008.

Organisation
International SOS is a privately owned company. They work with educational organisations, corporate clients (including the majority of the Fortune Global 500), corporate clients (including 89% of the Fortune Global 100 and 64% of Fortune Global 500), governmental organisations and non-governmental organisations (NGOs).

The firm has headquarters in Singapore and London. It operates worldwide via 81 offices and 26 assistance centres serving over 1,000 locations in 90 countries.

The firm takes around 4 million assistance calls every year with 99 languages and dialects spoken in their Assistance Centres, clinics and offices.

History

Pascal Rey-Herme, a doctor, and Arnaud Vaissié, a businessman, founded a company (then called AEA International) in 1985 to provide medical assistance services to expatriate communities and international organisations in Southeast Asia. Over the following decade, the company grew from its base in Singapore and Indonesia into a pan-Asian corporation, with operations in Hong Kong, Australia, Japan and mainland China. Key clients included oil and gas companies with operations in remote locations.

In 1998, AEA International acquired International SOS Assistance, a group of corporations founded in 1974 by Claude Giroux a Canadian entrepreneur, creating the largest medical assistance company in the world. Initially, it was known as AEA International SOS, and was renamed International SOS in 1999. The acquisition extended the company beyond Asia.

In 2012, International SOS moved its UK headquarters to Chiswick Business Park, West London.

Growth and acquisitions 
In 2008 the firm launched a strategic alliance with Control Risks to offer combined medical and security services, and acquired MedAire, a provider of remote medical services for aviation and maritime founded by Joan Sullivan Garrett.  

In 2009, it acquired a majority stake in Abermed, a UK-based provider of occupational health and remote medical services to the energy sector. In 2010, it developed a strategic alliance with RMSI, an international rapid deployment medical and rescue service, with activities in Iraq, Afghanistan, Sudan, Somalia and Pakistan.

In 2011, it merged with VIPdesk, a North American provider of concierge services, customer care and loyalty programs, acquired the medical supplies division of SMI (Service Médical International), acquired of L.E. West, EMC, Shenton Pharmacy and Nutracare Pharma, and launched a joint venture in Brazil with International Health Care.

In 2012, it acquired EMSM, a concierge and lifestyle company in South Korea. And in 2013, it acquired Norwegian companies SBHT, KBHT, Haugaland HMS, and Nordic Medical Services (NMS), and partnered with Aerosafety, a medical and aviation safety equipment company in Brazil.

In 2014, it launched Response Services Australia, a provider of emergency response, rescue and recovery services, entered a partnership with AMAS medical Services in India, acquired Aeromed in Mozambique, and created strategic partnership with West African Rescue Association (WARA), a clinic and medical services company in West Africa.

In 2016, it entered a strategic partnership with Everbridge.

In 2017, it entered a Duty of Care integration with Rocketrip, started joint venture partnerships with Global Excel and Iqarus, acquired International Health Solutions and launched a digital consultation service from Aberdeen Health Centre. It also started the world's first emotional support service for the mobile workforce.

In 2019, it took full responsibility of the services it was previously providing as part of the Control Risks joint venture, to provide its consolidated Security Services suite to clients.

In 2020, during the COVID-19 pandemic, it rapidly expanded its TeleConsultation services, part of its TeleHealth services, to over 30 countries.

Major assistance 
International SOS has provided medical advice, assistance, and travel safety services during and after a number of major incidents. These include the COVID-19 pandemic, the Jakarta unrest, the Mumbai terrorist attacks by helping those directly impacted by the event, and the Yemen crisis.

It has provided service during disease crises, including the provided medical assistance during the global COVID-19 pandemic, the 2003 SARS outbreak and the Ebola outbreak in West Africa.

It has dealt with major natural disasters such as the 2004 Boxing Day Tsunami, the 2004 Indian Ocean earthquake, the 2005 Hurricane Wilma, the 2010 Haiti earthquake, the 2011 Tōhoku earthquake and tsunami, the 2014 Cyclone Pam in Vanuatu, and the Sabah earthquake in Malaysia.

The firm has also provided services to major sporting events such as the Summer Olympic Games in 2000, 2004, 2008, and 2012, and the 2010 Asian Games.

In 2006, International SOS's medical transports became the first direct flights between mainland China and Taiwan to be flown since 1949.

Awards 
International SOS has received the following recognition and awards:

 2009 Arnaud Vaissié awarded Ernst and young Entrepreneur of The Year Award.
 2012 The publication 'Duty of Care Benchmarking Study' won 'Best Research Study of the Year' EMMA.
 2015: TravelTracker 6.0 won the Business Travel Awards 'Best Specialist Business Travel Product/Provider; the firm won Best Specialist Business Travel Product/Provider award - Business Travel Awards.
 2016 International SOS and Control Risks received the Individual Alliance Excellence Award from the Association of Strategic Alliance Professionals.
 2017: Risk Management Product of the Year, CIR Risk Management Awards for TravelTracker and Incident Management Services, International Healthcare and Risk Management Provider of the Year, FEM EMMA EMEA Award, and winner in four categories at the Americas EMMAs: Best Use of Data Analytics within Global Mobility, Most Innovative Use of Technology in Global Mobility - Assignee Management, International Healthcare and Risk Management Provider of the Year and Thought Leadership – Best Survey or Research Study of the Year.
 2018 International SOS Assistance UK LTD. Recognised as an investor in people, ISOA VANGUARD Award for Initiatives in post-conflict environments, Global Certification to ISO 9001 2015 Quality Management System, FEM APAC EMMA's AWARD
 2018 Aspire Lifestyles chosen as The Official Concierge Partner of the World's 50 Best Restaurants 2018 Awards
 2018 International SOS appointed as Fortune Global Forum's Preferred Medical Partner
 2019 Aspire Lifestyles chosen as the Official Concierge Partner of Asia's 50 Best Restaurant Awards 2019
 2019 International SOS 'Event Support' won Best Specialist Business Travel Service
 2019 MedAire named Security Information Provider of Choice by top airlines
 2019 International SOS received the ISOA Vanguard Award for initiatives in post-conflict environment, awarded ISO 27001 Certification for Best Practice in Information Security Management, CIR Risk Management Award for Event Support
 2019 International SOS recognised as the International Healthcare & Risk Management Provider of The Year at the 2019 FEM APAC EMMAS
 2019 International SOS – Johannesburg, Angola, Nigeria and Ghana awarded The Prestigious Top Employer Africa Certification
 2020 International SOS recognised as a Top Employer in the UK for 2020
 2020 2020 Aspire Lifestyles became the Official Concierge Partner of the World's 50 Best Restaurant Awards

International SOS Foundation
The International SOS Foundation launched in March 2012 with a grant from International SOS as a registered charity that is a fully independent and non-profit organisation.

The Foundation has the goal of improving the safety, security, health and welfare of people working abroad or on remote assignments through the study, understanding and mitigation of potential risks. It has published, and acts as a repository for, a number of academic papers, articles and advisory notes on these topics.

In 2016, the Foundation introduced the Duty of Care Awards to recognise organisations and individuals who have made a significant contribution to protecting their staff as they travel and work overseas.

In 2017, the Duty of Care Summit was launched, bringing together industry leaders to share best practices in the safety and security of the mobile and remote workforce; this event took place on the day of the Duty of Care Awards.

See also
 International healthcare accreditation

References

Multinational health care companies
Rescue aviation